The 2020–21 Georgia Bulldogs men's basketball team represented the University of Georgia during the 2020–21 NCAA Division I men's basketball season. The team is led by third-year head coach Tom Crean, and plays their home games at Stegeman Coliseum in Athens, Georgia as a member of the Southeastern Conference.

Offseason

Departures

Roster

Schedule and results

|-
!colspan=12 style=|Non-conference regular season

|-
!colspan=12 style=|SEC regular season

|-
!colspan=12 style=| SEC tournament

References

Georgia Bulldogs basketball seasons
Georgia Bulldogs
Georgia Bulldogs basketball
Georgia Bulldogs basketball